A stayer is a horse that may be a better performer when racing over a longer distance.

Stayer or The Stayer may also refer to:
 Canyon News (Texas) or The Stayer, a newspaper founded in 1896
 Stayer, a cyclist in motor-paced racing
 "The Stayer", a 2007 song by Mark Seymour from Westgate

People with the surname Stayer or Stayers
 James M. Stayer (born 1935), American historian
 Charlie Stayers (1937-2005), West Indian cricketer

See also